The Florianópolis Formation is a geological formation of the Santos Basin offshore of the Brazilian states of Rio de Janeiro, São Paulo, Paraná and Santa Catarina.

Etymology 
The formation is named after the city of Florianópolis, Santa Catarina.

Description 
These clastic units are thought to represent alluvial environments distributed along the western Brazilian basin margin, along the Santos Hinge Line. These alluvial environments were gradational towards the east, with the shallow marine carbonates of the Guarujá Formation, and further to the open basin with the siltstones of the Itanhaém Formation. Biostratigraphical data and its relations with the Guarujá Formation point towards an Albian age. The formation is laterally equivalent to the Goitacás Formation of the Campos Basin to the north.

The formation is the reservoir rock of the Pirapitanga Field in the Santos Basin.

See also 

 Campos Basin

References

Bibliography 
 
 
 

Geologic formations of Brazil
Santos Basin
Cretaceous Brazil
Lower Cretaceous Series of South America
Albian Stage
Sandstone formations
Shale formations
Siltstone formations
Alluvial deposits
Reservoir rock formations
Petroleum in Brazil
Geography of Paraná (state)
Geography of Rio de Janeiro (state)
Geography of Santa Catarina (state)
Geography of São Paulo (state)